Alex Tan (born March 13, 1996), better known under the screen names PangaeaPanga, Pepanga and formerly Penangbenny, is an American ROM hacker, speedrunner and tool-assisted speedrunner. He is best known as the creator of difficult Super Mario World ROM hacks and Super Mario Maker levels. His notable work includes Super Mario World ROM hack Super Dram World and Super Mario Maker levels "P-Break" and the "Pit of Panga" series. He has also played through Super Mario World blindfolded.

Personal life
Tan is from Rocky Hill, Connecticut, and is a graduate of Rocky Hill High School. His fastest mile run is 4:23.13. In 2018, he graduated from the University of Connecticut School of Business with a degree in management information systems, and was an NCAA Division I cross country runner for the UConn Huskies during the 2014–2015 season. He also plays the piano and trumpet.

Speedrunning career
PangaeaPanga was the world record holder for speedrunning Super Mario World in 2015, having beaten the game in 1 minute and 38 seconds using arbitrary code execution, though this record has since been beaten.

PangaeaPanga started playing Super Mario World while blindfolded on June 16, 2015, and completed a full run of the game this way eight days later. He has stated that he got the idea from gamer DavisKongCountry, who played portions of the game blindfolded. To beat the game in this way, PangaeaPanga memorized a route that was "easy and consistent", using musical cues from the game to know when to carry out certain actions. The run took 23 minutes, despite playing as the character Mario, dying a few times, and getting lost. After having his world record beaten on July 20, 2016, in a time of 17:46, he reclaimed the title a few days later on August 8, 2016, with a time of 15:59 using the Japanese release, before once again having his world record beaten on May 24, 2017, with a time of 13:31.

In September 2015, YouTube removed the majority of PangaeaPanga's tool-assisted speedrun videos from his channel after a Digital Millennium Copyright Act claim was made by Nintendo. PangaeaPanga described his YouTube channel as "wrecked" on Twitter and stated that he finds it a "shame" that content creators "are restricted to … Super Mario Maker instead of the way we have always done."

Super Mario levels

ROM hacks

Through ROM hacking, PangaeaPanga has made several difficult levels for Super Mario World, the most famous of which is "Item Abuse 3". This level, which took three years to create and beat, has been described as "the hardest Super Mario World level ever". The level is impossible to beat without making use of tool-assistance to allow individual frame button input. PangaeaPanga has declared that "Anyone who can complete this is pretty much mentally insane."

In addition to the Item Abuse series, PangeaPanga has also created three additional hacks inspired by the Kaizo Mario World series titled Super Dram World, Super Dram World 2, and Super Foss World, of which the former two have been speedrun live at a Games Done Quick event.

Super Mario Maker
In September 2015, 10 days after the American release of Super Mario Maker, PangaeaPanga uploaded "Pit of Panga: P-Break". The level, which took five hours to create, had to be beaten beforehand to be uploaded to Super Mario Maker servers, as the game prevents players from uploading impossible levels. PangaeaPanga beat the level in nine hours, all of which he streamed on Twitch. "P-Break" was a sequel to "Bomb Voyage", another difficult level PangaeaPanga created. It took the Super Mario Maker community a collective total of 11,000 tries before speedrunner Bananasaurus Rex beat this level.

By the end of October 2015, "P-Break" was beaten 41 times. After stating that "in an ideal world, no more than ten clears would satisfy me", PangaeaPanga went on to create the even more difficult "Pit of Panga: U-Break", which was later awarded the world record for the "Most difficult level created in Super Mario Maker" by Guinness World Records. PangaeaPanga influenced several other people to create unusually difficult Super Mario Maker levels. In an interview, PangaeaPanga has stated that he never really tried to build easy levels, as he enjoys to "force players to take a single specific route", in contrast to the autonomy video games usually offer players. Furthermore, PangaeaPanga has noted that he aims to make levels "both fair and fun, without being too aggravating or difficult",  which he achieves by playtesting his levels extensively.

Another level of his creation, "Cyber Security 101: Brute Force" in Super Mario Maker 2, required players to enter two random eight-digit numbers, giving a player a 1 in 10 quadrillion chance of winning on a random attempt.

On June 1, 2021, Canadian speedrunner Warspyking became the first player to consecutively beat all 47 levels created by PangeaPanga in Super Mario Maker 1, setting the world record at 8 hours, 55 minutes and 7 seconds.

References

Further reading

External links
 PangaeaPanga's Twitch.tv channel
 YouTube channel
 Profile on Speedrun.com

Video game speedrunners
Living people
American esports players
1996 births
People from Rocky Hill, Connecticut
UConn Huskies men's cross country runners
American people of Chinese descent
American people of Malaysian descent
People in information technology
Mario players
Twitch (service) streamers